Transition metal carboxylate complexes are coordination complexes with carboxylate (RCO2−) ligands. Reflecting the diversity of carboxylic acids, the inventory of metal carboxylates is large.  Many are useful commercially, and many have attracted intense scholarly scrutiny. Carboxylates exhibit a variety of coordination modes, most common are κ1- (O-monodentate), κ2 (O,O-bidentate), and bridging.

Acetate and related monocarboxylates

Structure and bonding
Carboxylates bind to single metals by one or both oxygen atoms, the respective notation being κ1- and κ2-. In terms of electron counting, κ1-carboxylates are "X"-type ligands, i.e., a pseudohalide-like. κ2-carboxylates are "L-X ligands", i.e. resembling the combination of a Lewis base (L) and a pseudohalide (X).  Carboxylates are classified as hard ligands, in HSAB theory.

For simple carboxylates, the acetate complexes are illustrative.  Most transition metal acetates are mixed ligand complexes.  One common example is hydrated nickel acetate, Ni(O2CCH3)2(H2O)4, which features intramolecular hydrogen-bonding between the uncoordinated oxygens and the protons of aquo ligands. Stoichiometrically simple complexes are often multimetallic.  One family are the basic metal acetates, of the stoichiometry [M3O(OAc)6(H2O)3]n+.

Homoleptic complexes
Homoleptic carboxylate complexes are usually coordination polymers.  But exceptions exist.

A molecular monocarboxylate is silver acetate, Ag2(OAc)2. 
Molecular diacetates are more common. Several diacetates adopt the Chinese lantern structure.  Well studied examples include the dimetal tetraacetates (M2(OAc)4) including rhodium(II) acetate, copper(II) acetate,  molybdenum(II) acetate, and chromium(II) acetate.  Platinum diacetate and palladium diacetate feature Pt4 and Pd3 cores, further illustrating the tendency of acetate ligands to stabilize multimetallic structures.
Mononuclear triacetates include derivatives of 1-adamantanecarboxylic acid, which have the formula [M(O2CC10H11)4]− (M = Co, Ni, Zn).

Reactions and applications
Attempts to prepare some carboxylate complexes, especially for electrophilic metals, often gives oxo derivatives.  Examples include the oxo-acetates of Fe(III), Mn(III), and Cr(III).

Metal acetates are common catalysts or precatalysts.  Particularly useful are the ethylhexanoates and related metallic soaps.  These lipophilic complexes are used as catalysts in oxidation reactions, e.g. oil drying agents.

Synthesis
Many methods allow the synthesis of metal carboxylates.  From preformed carboxylic acid, the following routes have been demonstrated:
acid-base reactions: 
protonolysis: 
oxidative addition: 

From preformed carboxylate, salt metathesis reactions are common:

Metal carboxylates can be prepared by carbonation of highly basis metal alkyls:

Reactions

A common reaction of metal carboxylates is their displacement by more basic ligands.  Acetate is a common leaving group.  They are especially prone to protonolysis, which is widely used to introduce ligands, displacing the carboxylic acid. In this way octachlorodimolybdate is produced from dimolybdenum tetraacetate:

Acetates of electrophilic metals are proposed to function as bases in concerted metalation deprotonation reactions.

Pyrolysis of metal carboxylates affords acid anhydrides and the metal oxide.  This reaction explains the formation of basic zinc acetate from anhydrous zinc diacetate.

In some cases, monodentate carboxylates undergo O-alkylation to give esters.  Strong alkylating agents are required.

Di- and polycarboxylates

Benzenedi- and tricarboxylates
Metal organic frameworks, porous, three-dimensional coordination polymers, are often derived from metal carboxylate clusters.  These clusters, called secondary bonding units (SBU's), are often linked by the conjugate bases of benzenedi- and tricarboxylic acids.

Aminopolycarboxylates

A commercially important family of metal carboxylates are derived from aminopolycarboxylates, e.g., EDTA4-.  Related to these synthetic chelating agents are the amino acids, which form large families of amino acid complexes.  Two amino acids, glutamate and aspartate, have carboxylate side chains, which function as ligands for iron in nonheme iron proteins, such as hemerythrin.

References

Ligands
Coordination chemistry
Salts of carboxylic acids